Zygaena is a genus of moths in the family Zygaenidae. These brightly coloured, day-flying moths are native to the West Palearctic.

Description
Adalbert Seitz described them thus: 
"Small, stout, black insects, sometimes with metallic gloss. Antenna very strongly developed; the club being considerably incrassate distally. Tongue long and strong. Legs rather short. Forewing elongate oval,black or red, rarely spotted with white or yellow. Hindwing small, usually red, seldom black. —Larva strongly humpbacked, very soft, downy-haired. Pupa in a paper-like silky cocoon, the sheaths of legs and wings being loosely soldered together. The moths are mostly local, their stations being often restricted to a mountain, a meadow, etc. They appear mostly in large numbers at their special localities, swarming about flowers, which they suck, fore instance Scabious, Thistles, Eryngium, etc., their flight being slow and straight on. The body of these insects contains, as in the other Zygaenids, a yellow , acrid, oily hquid which renders them nauseous, protecting them not only against their enemies among the vertebrates, but apparently even against predatory insects, fore instance Asilids. Like all insects protected by the body-juices, they are extremely tenacious of life, enduring considerable wounds as well as resisting strong poison for some time (cyanide of potassium). They conceal themselves in no way, mostly resting conspicuously on stalks or sprigs, hardly taking to the wing when touched, so that one can often pick them off by the long antennae.

The latter are not concealed beneath the wings when at rest, as in other Heterocera, but are held straight forwaid. The main locality for the genus are the Mediterranean coast districts, of Europe as well as of the Atlas countries and the Levant, where the Zygaenae occur in a great abundance of forms, which partly intergrade and are found in immense numbers of specimens. There are often several individuals of different species on a flower, which easily explains that hybridisation obtains here more often than in any other group of Lepidoptera. However, such copulations appear to be mostly without result. The Zygaenae are best killed by injection of some strong tobacco juice With the help of the hollow needle of a morphia syringe.As in all protected Lepidoptera the specifically distinct forms are without exception very common at their localities, the commercial value depending solely on the accessibleness of these places. The number of species is largest in South Europe, North Africa and Asia Minor, thence decreasing rapidly in all directions. The pacific coast of Asia is reached by one species only and the higher North of Europe by two, while not one occurs in South Asia. Outside the Palaearctic Region there occur only a few speciesin South and East Africa, while two Palaearctic forms extend into the Punjab and the Nepalese valleys of the Himalayas.The species are on the whole very similar to one another and also very constant, varying only in certain directions. There occur of nearly all species individuals for instance with yellow instead of red markings. The normally six-spotted species may exceptionally have five spots, and inversely. In species which bear a red belt the latter may sometimes be absent, and in non-belted forms the belt may appear in rare cases. The spots of the forewing may be edged with white and merged. Lastly, the marginal band of the hindwing may be so widened as to more or less displace the red ground-colour. These various aberrations have in may cases received names.

Species
Subgenus Mesembrynus Hübner, [1819]

Subgenus Agrumenia Hübner, [1819]

Subgenus Zygaena Fabricius, 1775

References

A. Hofmann and W. G. Tremewan 2010 A revised check-list of the genus Zygaena Fabricius, 1775 (Lepidoptera: Zygaenidae, Zygaeninae), based on the biospecies concept  Entomologist’s Gazette 61: 119–131 
Seitz A., 1913, in Seitz, Gross-Schmett. Erde 6: 22.,The Macrolepidoptera of the Palearctic Fauna 2. Volume: The Palearctic Bombyces & Sphinges.

External links
 List of Zygaena Types
 

 
Zygaenidae genera